Re or RE may refer to:

Geography
 Re, Norway, a former municipality in Vestfold county, Norway
 Re, Vestland, a village in Gloppen municipality, Vestland county, Norway
 Re, Piedmont, an Italian municipality
 Île de Ré, an island off the west coast of France
 Le Bois-Plage-en-Ré, a commune on that island
 Re di Anfo, a torrent (seasonal stream) in Italy
 Re di Gianico, Re di Niardo, Re di Sellero, and Re di Tredenus, torrents in the Val Camonica
 Réunion (ISO 3166-1 code), a French overseas department and island in the Indian Ocean

Music
 Re, the second syllable of the scale in solfège
 Re, or D (musical note), the second note of the musical scale in fixed do solfège
 Re: (band), a musical duo based in Canada and the United States

Albums
 Re (Café Tacuba album)
 Re (Les Rita Mitsouko album)
 Re. (Aya Ueto album)
 Re: (Kard EP)

Other media
 Resident Evil, popular video game franchise of survival horror
...Re (film), a 2016 Indian Kannada-language film

Language
 re (interjection), in Greek
 Re (kana), the Japanese syllables written れ and レ
 In re, Latin for 'in the matter of...'
 RE: and Re:, used in email subject lines

People
Giovanni  Battista Re, Italian cardinal
 Cayetano Ré, former Paraguayan footballer

Political parties
 Renew Europe, a political group in the European Parliament
 Renovación Española, a former Spanish monarchist political party

Science, technology and mathematics

Computer science and mathematics
 RE (complexity) (recursively enumerable), a complexity class of decision problems
 r.e., a common abbreviation for the older term Recursively enumerable
 Regular expression, a sequence of characters to match text against a specified pattern
 Re function in mathematics, where Re(z) denotes the real part of a complex number z

Other uses in science and technology
 Effective reproduction number, in epidemiology
 Relative effectiveness, or RE factor, an expression of an explosive's demolition power
 Renewable energy
 Reverse engineering
 Reynolds number, a dimensionless quantity in fluid mechanics used to help predict flow patterns
 Rhenium, symbol Re, a chemical element
 Re, an abbreviation for "reference pressure" as Sound pressure level
 Re, an abbreviation for "reference pressure" in Underwater acoustics

Other uses
 Religious education (RE), the study of religion
 Re (Egyptian religion), an ancient Egyptian god also known as Ra
 Regional-Express, a type of regional train in Germany, Luxembourg and Austria
 Royal Engineers, a part of the British Army
 Royal Society of Painter-Printmakers, whose fellows may use the Post-nominal letters RE

See also

Il re, Italian-language opera
 Rhee (disambiguation)
 Ree (disambiguation)
 
 Res (disambiguation)